Stephen Winsten (1893–1991) was the name adopted by Samuel Weinstein, one of the 'Whitechapel Boys' group of young Jewish men and future writers in London's East End in the years before World War I (the others included Isaac Rosenberg, John Rodker and Joseph Leftwich). In the First World War he was a conscientious objector, and imprisoned in Bedford and Reading gaols. He is now known for his works about George Bernard Shaw, and his life of Henry Salt.

He married the artist Clara Birnberg (1894–1989); they both became Quakers. She as Clare Winsten is known for some sculptures, including one of St. Joan in the garden of Shaw’s house in Ayot St Lawrence in Hertfordshire, where Shaw and the Winstens were neighbours.  Stephen's and Clara's daughter Ruth Harrison, a conscientious objector in WW2, was known as a campaigner for animal rights.

Works 
 G.B.S. 90: Aspects of Bernard Shaw's Life and Work (1946); editor
 Days with Bernard Shaw (1948)
 Salt and His Circle (1951); preface by Shaw
 Shaw's Corner (1952)
 Jesting Apostle: The Private Life of Bernard Shaw (1956)

External links 
 Jewish Quarterly article on the Whitechapel Boys

1893 births
1991 deaths
English biographers
British conscientious objectors
British emigrants to the United States
American Quakers
Converts to Quakerism from Judaism
Converts to Quakerism
English Jews
British Jewish writers
Whitechapel Boys
People from Ayot St Lawrence